Klara Höfels (5 April 1949 – 15 May 2022) was a German actress, director and theatre producer. She was first a stage actress, who played leading roles on stage at Schauspiel Frankfurt, Residenztheater in Munich and Staatstheater Stuttgart. She became known for roles in television series such as SOKO and Hinter Gittern – Der Frauenknast, beginning in the 1990s. She produced film documentaries, responsible for direction and camera, and ran Autorentheater Berlin for new theatre projects.

Life 
Born on 5 April 1949 in Grevenbroich, Höfels studied to be an actress at the Folkwang-Hochschule in Essen from 1969 to 1972. She had a relationship with the actor ; their daughter Alwara Höfels, born in 1982, also became an actress.

Höfels died in Berlin on 15 May 2022 at age 73 after a short illness.

Theatre 
Höfels was first engaged at the Schlosstheater Celle from 1972 to 1974. She then moved to the Schauspiel Frankfurt, directed by Peter Palitzsch also as a Mitbestimmungstheater. She collaborated with directors such as Hans Neuenfels and Maria Reinhard.

She played Marjorie in William Mastrosimone's Extremities directed by Reinhard.

In 1985, she moved to the Staatstheater Stuttgart where she remained until 1990. Leading roles there included Anna Petrovna in Michael Frayn's Wild Honey, alongside Gert Voss as Platonov. From 1990, Höfels worked freelance to focus on her own projects for theatre and films. She played as a guest with the Berliner Ensemble in 1997, in the role of Frau Sarti in Brecht's Leben des Galilei, alongside  Sepp Bierbichler in the title role, directed by Tragelehn.

Film and television 
Beginning in the mid-1990s, Höfels also played in film and television. She played in crime series such as SOKO, the role of Ingrid Schlüter in the RTL Hinter Gittern – Der Frauenknast from 2006 to 2007. In 2017, she portrayed Dr. Hannelore Thies in the tele-novela Rote Rosen. She played in the series  Wilsberg, and in 2020 the physician Dr. Susanne Oppermann in Gute Besserung of the ZDF Ein starkes Team.

World premieres 
Höfels promoted new plays, some in collaboration with Christian Duda:
 1989:  Medea Medea, coproduction with Staatstheater Nürnberg, authors: Christian Duda and Helmut Lorin, Medea: Klara Höfels, director: C. A. Gad Elkarim
 1991:  EswarKriegesistKriegeswirdKriegsein, coproduction with Renitenztheater Stuttgart, author: Duda, director: Elkarim
 1990: Theater Intim – coproduction with Renitenztheater Stuttgart, author and actor: Lorin, director: Elkarim
 1992: Lucrezia Borgia, commission of Universität Stuttgart for the congress Die Borgia in Schwäbisch Hall, author: Duda, production and acting: Höfels, director: Elkarim
 1993: Dr. hc. Burkhardt Blässling, author: Duda, director: Elkarim
 1997: Der Jude von Malta by Christopher Marlowe arranged by Duda, Theater am Ufer Berlin, production and acting: Höfels, direction: Elkarim

She founded the Autorentheater Berlin (Authors' theatre), with projects including:
 2005: Leben: Acht Frauen – acht Wege, coproduction with Theaterhaus Mitte Berlin, conceived and directed by Höfels
 2006: Leonida oder Miss Europa, author: , Leonida: Höfels, director: 
 2008–2009: Pantarhei-allesfließt, at Babylon Berlin, Rosa-Luxemburg-Platz
 2010: Der Abend nach dem Begräbnis der besten Freundin, coproduction with Kesselhaus der Kulturbrauerei Berlin, author: Marlene Streeruwitz, director:

Filmography

Documentaries 
Höfels produced several documentaries, from idea to direction, camera and editing, including:
 2010: 10 MONATE
 2009: Das letzte Mal (camera also Harald Korff, editing also Britt Kanja)
 2008: Klara Klar
 2007: Frauenleben

Awards 
 2016: Eho (Echo) – Silver Zenith, International Film Festival in Montreal
 2018: A Mere Breath – Heart of Sarajevo for the best short film

References

External links 
 
 

 Klara Höfels (in German, management) Red Carpet Actors
 Klara Höfels (in German) theapolis.de
 Klara Höfels (in German) Autorentheater Berlin
 Klara Höfels filmmakers.de

1949 births
2022 deaths
German film actresses
German stage actresses
German theatre directors
Women theatre directors
German theatre managers and producers
People from Rhein-Kreis Neuss
Folkwang University of the Arts alumni
20th-century German actresses
21st-century German actresses